Lindsay McGie (born 30 March 1945) is a former Australian rules footballer who played with Essendon in the Victorian Football League (VFL) and Port Adelaide in the South Australian National Football League (SANFL). A long-kicking left-footer, McGie was named Essendon's best first year player in 1964. He missed the 1966 and 1967 season due to serving in the Vietnam War. After two more seasons with Essendon, McGie moved to South Australia and played with Port Adelaide for three seasons. He later played for country South Australian club, Lyndoch, and then returned to Port as coach of the under-19s.

Notes

External links 		
		

Essendon Football Club past player profile

		
		

1945 births
Living people
Australian rules footballers from Victoria (Australia)
Essendon Football Club players
Australian military personnel of the Vietnam War
Port Adelaide Football Club (SANFL) players
Port Adelaide Football Club players (all competitions)